The Greater Sudbury municipal election, 2003 was held in the city of Greater Sudbury, Ontario, Canada on 10 November 2003. All municipal elections in the province of Ontario are held on the same date; see 2003 Ontario municipal elections for elections in other cities.

The election chose the mayor and city councillors who would sit on Greater Sudbury City Council from 2003 to 2006.

Issues

The primary issue in the 2003 elections was the municipal amalgamation of 2001. Prior to 1 January 2001, the current city of Greater Sudbury consisted of seven separate municipalities, together comprising the Regional Municipality of Sudbury. On that date, the provincial government of Ontario dissolved all seven former municipalities and the regional government, merging them all into the current city government.

Under longtime mayor Jim Gordon, the preceding city council – the first to govern the amalgamated city – had struggled to pull the new city together, with soaring costs and deterioration of public services that had not been foreseen by the provincial government when the amalgamation was legislated. Voter anger was directed primarily at the provincial government of Mike Harris rather than the city council, although the council was criticized for some of the budgeting decisions it made, such as closing many municipally-owned recreational facilities.

Ward boundaries

When the current city of Greater Sudbury was created in 2001, the city was divided into six wards, each of which was represented by two councillors. This structure was controversial, as some voters felt that the division of responsibility among councillors was vague and ill-defined – it could, for example, be unclear which of the two ward councillors to approach in regards to a political issue.

In 2005, the city council adopted a new ward structure, in which the city would now be divided into twelve wards with a single councillor per ward. The new ward structure was implemented for the first time in the 2006 municipal election.

Results

Mayoral race

Incumbent mayor Jim Gordon did not run for reelection in 2003. As a result of his retirement, the mayoral race attracted an unexpectedly large field of 14 candidates. This was the second largest slate of mayoral candidates of any Ontario city in this election cycle – Toronto was the only city in the province with more candidates for mayor. The race was generally perceived, however, to have two leading candidates: David Courtemanche, an incumbent city councillor, and Paul Marleau, a businessman and the husband of the city's federal Member of Parliament Diane Marleau.

Ward 1
Two to be elected.

Ward 2
Two to be elected.

Ward 3
Two to be elected.

Ward 4
Two to be elected.

Ward 5
Two to be elected.

Ward 6
Two to be elected.

References

2003 Ontario municipal elections
2003